Preminchu Pelladu ( First Love then Marriage) is a 1985 Telugu-language comedy film produced by Ramoji Rao under the Usha Kiran Movies banner and directed by Vamsy. It stars Rajendra Prasad and Bhanupriya, with music composed by Ilaiyaraaja. The film is the debut of Rajendra Prasad as a hero.

Plot
Kurmavataram (Satyanarayana) is a paterfamilias of an orthodox Brahmin family who is an adamant believer in his customs and traditions. He has 3 daughters and a son. Kurmavataram's younger daughter Rukmini (Anitha) marries a Christian for which she is ostracized by the family. After 20 years, destiny brings Rukmini's daughter Radha (Bhanupriya) to Kurmavataram as a nurse when he is terminally ill. Rambabu (Rajendra Prasad) grandson of Kurmavataram falls for Radha. Parallelly, Hanumantha Rao (Rallapalli) their distant relative ploys to knit his daughter Saraswathi (Tulasi) with Rambabu who is already in love with a guy Babji (Subhalekha Sudhakar). Thereafter, Rambabu knows the truth of Radha. The rest of the story is a comic tale, how Rambabu & Radha teach a lesson to Kurmavataram.

Cast

Rajendra Prasad as Rambabu
Bhanupriya as Radha 
Satyanarayana as Kurmavataram
Subhalekha Sudhakar as Babji
Suthi Veerabhadra Rao as Raghava Rao 
Rallapalli as Hanumantha Rao 
Hema Sundar as Subhadra's husband 
Bheemiswara Rao as Doctor
Sattibabu as Rambabu's friend
Dham as Compounder Appalakonda
Tulasi as Saraswathi
Radha Kumari as Rambabu's mother 
Anitha as Rukmini
Kakinada Shyamala as Subhadra 
Dubbing Janaki as Urmila
Y. Vijaya as Damayanthi

Soundtrack

Music composed by Ilaiyaraaja. Lyrics were written by Veturi. Music released on Echo Audio Company.

References

External links

Indian comedy films
1980s Telugu-language films
Films directed by Vamsy
Films scored by Ilaiyaraaja
1985 comedy films
1985 films